Fantasy Canyon is a  canyon containing unusual rock formations that were created through erosion and weathering. Fantasy Canyon is managed by the Bureau of Land Management and is only accessible via the Fantasy Canyon Trail.

Description
The site was officially documented by early explorer and paleontologist Earl Douglass, who recorded the area by other names such as "The Devil's Playground" and "Hades Pit." He published photographs of this area in a 1909 publication called The Columbian Magazine.

The canyon is accessed by the  Fantasy Canyon Trail, also known as the Fantasy Canyon Loop trail.

Geology
The rocks of Fantasy Canyon, quartzose sandstones, were deposited during the Eocene Epoch. They date from around 38 to 50 million years ago. During the geologic period, the Uinta Basin was occupied by a large lake called Lake Uinta.

Stratigraphy: member C, Uinta Formation, Eocene.

Fantasy Canyon is along the east shore of what was once Lake Uinta, where the sediments eroded from the surrounding high lands. Sediments were deposited and the once loose sands, silts, and clays were forged into sandstone and shale. Because of different rates of weathering, the more durable sandstone remained while the more easily weathered siltstone and shale washed away, yielding this spectacular scenery. Today's geologic formations of Fantasy Canyon will eventually give way to weather and then topple and erode into sand, but new formations will appear as the topsoil washes away. Because the delicate formations are so fragile the area is referred to as "Nature's China Shop." Names have been assigned to some of the rock formations, which resemble bleached-out coral, gargoyles, and stalagmites. Many of the rock clusters are highly fragile. The "teapot formation" collapsed in 2006.

Mineralization
There are black ribbons of coal-like material along the small washes on the trail or as horizontal stripes in the rocks. This magnetic material is called magnetite (iron oxide).

There are inch-wide, black-colored, subvertical, northwest-southeast trending gilsonite dikes that have intruded the rocks at Fantasy Canyon. Gilsonite, named after U.S. Marshall Samuel H. Gilson, is a type of asphaltite-solidified hydrocarbon. Gilsonite was discovered in the early 1860s.  Starting in the mid-1880s, Gilson promoted the material as a waterproof coating for wooden pilings, as an insulation for wire cable, and as a unique varnish.

Fossils
The Eocene-aged Uinta Formation is fossiliferous. It contains widely scattered bones, mostly mammals, which roamed the Basin during the Eocene. Fossilized turtle shells are visible in the area.

See also

 List of canyons and gorges in Utah

References

External links

 Current BLM Fantasy Canyon website

Canyons and gorges of Utah
Landforms of Uintah County, Utah
Rock formations of Utah
Bureau of Land Management areas in Utah
Protected areas of Uintah County, Utah